St Andrew's Church, Headington is a Church of England parish church in the village of Old Headington, Oxfordshire, England, now absorbed as part of the suburb of Headington in the city of Oxford. The church building is located in St Andrew's Road. It is a Grade II* listed building.

History
The church was built c.1160 in the Norman style. A south aisle and tower were added in the 13th century. In 1862, J. C. Buckler lengthened the nave.

Present day
The parish stands in the Traditional Catholic tradition of the Church of England. The parish passed Resolutions A and B in 2010 to show that it rejected the ordination of women. , however, the Revd Jennifer Strawbridge is listed as "assisting clergy" on the church's website.

Gallery

See also
 List of churches in Oxford
 St Andrew's Church, Oxford

References

External links

 St Andrew's Church, Headington website

12th-century church buildings in England
12th-century establishments in England
Church of England church buildings in Oxford
Grade II listed buildings in Oxford
Grade II listed churches in Oxfordshire
English churches with Norman architecture
Anglo-Catholic church buildings in Oxfordshire